Michael Booker is a former NFL cornerback. Michael Booker may also refer to:

 Michael Booker (figure skater) (born 1937), former British figure skater
 Michael Booker, American football player for the 2014 Detroit Thunder season
 Mike Booker (born 1947), English footballer
 Michael Dennis Booker, lawyer and former state legislator in Arkansas